Informal wear or  undress, also called business wear, corporate/office wear, tenue de ville or dress clothes, is a Western dress code for clothing defined by a business suit for men, and cocktail dress or pant suit for women. On the scale of formality, it is considered less formal than semi-formal wear but more formal than casual wear. Informal or undress should not be confused with casual wear such as business casual or smart casual; most situations calling for “informal wear” will usually tolerate casual dress to varying extents.

The suit originated as leisure wear in the late 19th century but eventually replaced the frock coat as everyday wear in the city. After World War I, the suit was established as informal daily wear. Hats, such as fedora or bowler hats, are sometimes worn with informal wear.

Informal wear is commonly applied for office use in professions like politics, academia, law and finance, business, as well as certain events such as job interviews in other sectors. It is a traditional dress code that aims to indicate respect to the situation and not draw attention.

History
The suit originated in Britain in the 19th-century as a leisurewear. Seeking a casual alternative to the knee-length, heavy frock coats then considered appropriate business dress, men began to wear lighter coats cut just below the seat when not engaged in business.

Standard suit-making fabric is fine combed wool, with the inclusion of cashmere in more expensive fabrics. Middle-price suits are often made of wool-polyester blends, whilst the cheapest are made entirely of polyester fabric.

This business suit (also known as the "sack suit" in North America, commonly by Brooks Brothers) became the standard business daywear for all men who were not engaged in physical labor. The waistcoat (British) or vest (American) was worn regularly with the suit up to World War II, but is rarely seen today, due to central heating in offices and the expense of construction. Until at least the early 1960s it was common to wear a hat.

In general, business suits are characterized by three styles and a fourth fusion style. English suits are noted for having a "touch fit" to the wearer's body shape and carefully made padded shoulders. Italian suits are often slimmer, with higher armholes and highly shaped to complement a slim physique. Traditional American suits have lightly padded shoulders and loose natural fit with minimal shaping. Since the 1960s, designer brands (especially Polo Ralph Lauren) have created fusion style that brings a more shaped European look to the natural American cut.

Suits in Britain were often made in tweed, often with three pieces, and were worn outside the City of London.  Tweed is made from uncombed wool, and, like all fabrics from the time, was thick and durable (18-ounce was considered medium-weight in the Edwardian era).  A full tweed suit is less common today, with just tweed sports jackets more often worn, but is still used generally as everyday wear by some, and for outdoor sports such as shooting and angling.  It is worn with appropriate accompanying clothes, much as any other suit; brown full brogues and wool ties are common items not worn with other types of suit.

Etiquette
Informal attire is today considered a form of dress customarily appropriate for all formal settings, which do not explicitly require white tie or black tie. For instance, it is commonly worn to religious services and funerals, in government offices and schools. Some professions, like law or finance, may require it. Because of its strong association with the business world, informal attire is also known as international standard business dress, business professional or business formal.

Boys and men
Dress socks, differentiated from normal socks by a tighter fit and traditionally dark colors.
Underpants, seen as required by casual and above.
Dress pants, generally monochrome, and in a dark color or khaki colored pants. This does not normally include jeans.
Dress shoes, brown or black leather shoes. This can also include boat shoes.
Dress shirt, traditionally white, cream, or light blue, but pastel pink and lavender may be viewed as equally appropriate; checkered and striped shirts are seen as acceptable in most circumstances
Polo shirt, replacing the dress shirt, this has seen a surge in fashion starting in the mid to late 2010s.

Girls and women

Tights, Pantyhose, knee highs, stockings, or leggings generally covering the legs is good practice
Undergarments, such as a bra and panties, the latter seen as required in casual and above
One of:
Slacks and a blouse, turtleneck or sweater or
A skirt and a blouse, turtleneck or sweater or
A dress
Dress shoes, for example ballet flats, riding boots, boat shoes, loafers, or pumps.
Makeup; however, more and more people are wearing less makeup

See also
 Western dress codes
 Suit
 semi-formal wear
 Formal wear
 casual wear

References

External links

Clothing by function
 
Workwear
Dress codes